"Girl on TV" is a song written and performed by American boy band LFO. It was released in November 1999 from their debut album, LFO (1999). The song peaked at number 10 on the US Billboard Hot 100 and number six in the United Kingdom, where it is their highest-charting hit. "Girl on TV" was certified gold by the Recording Industry Association of America (RIAA) in December 1999 for the shipment of over 500,000 copies in the US.

Background
Band member Rich Cronin began dating actress Jennifer Love Hewitt in 1999 after meeting her backstage at the Blockbuster Entertainment Awards. Cronin wrote "Girl on TV" about Hewitt, and she also appeared in the music video, directed by Gregory Dark.

Track listings
US CD and cassette single
 "Girl on TV" – 4:07
 "Girl on TV" (instrumental) – 4:07
 "All I Need to Know" – 3:49

UK CD single
 "Girl on TV" – 4:08
 "Girl on TV" (James Khari's Nimble mix) – 4:32
 "Girl on TV" (interactive track)

UK cassette single
 "Girl on TV" – 4:08
 "Summer Girls" – 4:17

European and Australian CD single
 "Girl on TV" (radio edit) – 4:07
 "Girl on TV" (Bassment Flip remix) – 5:02
 "Girl on TV" (Radio Vibe remix) – 4:07
 "Girl on TV" (Jan & Junes club remix) – 4:41
 "Girl on TV" (James Khari's Nimble remix) – 4:33

Charts

Weekly charts

Year-end charts

Certifications

Release history

References

1999 singles
1999 songs
Arista Records singles
Jennifer Love Hewitt
LFO (American band) songs
Music videos directed by Gregory Dark
Songs written by Rich Cronin